Zion Poplars Baptist Church is a historic Baptist church located near Gloucester, Gloucester County, Virginia. It was built in 1894 during the Reconstruction Era, and served more than just religious functions. As one of the oldest independent African American congregations in Gloucester County, Virginia, the church also served the economic and educational needs of its community. It was built in the Gothic Revival style with vernacular detailing, attributed to the handiwork of Frank Braxton, a former slave. The church gained its name from the historical origins of the church and congregation, because the first services were held under seven united poplar trees. Four of these trees still stand on church grounds today.

It was added to the National Register of Historic Places in 1999.

References

External links
Virginia African Heritage Program: Zion Poplars Baptist Church

African-American history of Virginia
Gothic Revival church buildings in Virginia
Churches completed in 1894
19th-century Baptist churches in the United States
Churches in Gloucester County, Virginia
Churches on the National Register of Historic Places in Virginia
National Register of Historic Places in Gloucester County, Virginia